Eduardo Juan Couture Etcheverry (1904–1956) was an Uruguayan jurist whose works are fundamental to the teaching of procedural law in Latin America.

Couture taught at the University of the Republic, Uruguay from 1931 on. His main area of interest was civil procedure.

He found America-wide recognition as the editor of the journal Revista de Derecho, Jurisprudencia y Administración, and as the author of the textbooks Fundamentos de Derecho Procesal Civil (1942) and Estudios de Derecho Civil (1948–50).

Couture's approach to legal procedure was founded on the constitutional rights of individuals. It was also informed by a systematic comparison of Latin American codes of procedure.

References
 

1904 births
1956 deaths
Uruguayan people of French descent
Uruguayan people of Basque descent
Place of birth missing
University of the Republic (Uruguay) alumni
Academic staff of the University of the Republic (Uruguay)
Uruguayan jurists
Burials at the Central Cemetery of Montevideo